Trillionaire may refer to:

"Trillionaire" (Bun B song), 2010
"Trillionaire" (Future song), 2020
Trillionaire$, a Canadian hip hop project

See also
Trillion (disambiguation)
Billionaire (disambiguation)